Frank Maguire Mayo (1839–June 8, 1896) was an American actor and comedian, born in Boston, Massachusetts.

He followed the Gold Rush to San Francisco, where at 17 years of age he began his theatrical career after failure in the mines. Within a few years he was appearing in the stock company of manager Thomas Maguire with the young Edwin Booth. In the early 1860s he supported Adah Isaacs Menken and won acclaim for his first Hamlet performed before Virginia City, Nevada, audiences.  He won applause in some classic roles, but his first great success was as Badger in The Streets of New York, in which he appeared in Boston in August 1865. In 1872 he brought out Davy Crockett, a backwoods character which endeared him to the public. In later years he played in Davy Crockett revivals. Mayo was an early proponent of realism in acting technique.

"Frank Mayo had a delightful home, which he named Crockett Lodge, at which he and his family spent much of their leisure time. The place was near Canton, Pa."

Mayo's daughter Eleanora Nellie Mayo (1872-1929) was married to James Elverson Jr., editor and owner of the Philadelphia Inquirer. His daughter, Deronda Mayo, also acted, including being a member of the 1901 summer stock cast at the Elitch Theatre.  His son, Frank Mayo, followed in his father's footsteps and became an actor and performed many of the same roles for which his father was known.

Mark Twain's Pudd'nhead Wilson was a character well suited to display his talents as a comedian. Other favorite roles were in "Nordeck" and "The Royal Guard".

On June 8, 1896, Mayo died west of Grand Island while riding a Union Pacific train. His friend in Denver, Mary Elitch Long recounted his final visit: Mayo "never came to Denver without spending some time with us. His last appearance in the city was as Davy Crockett, at the Broadway Theatre... While returning to New York from this Western trip, the sudden death of this splendid actor occurred as his train neared Omaha." He is buried in West Laurel Hill Cemetery, Edgewood Section, Plot 299, in Bala Cynwyd, Pennsylvania.

References

External links

Biography-West Laurel Hill Cemetery web site

Sarony portraits of Frank Mayo and Herbert Kelcey(archived)

1839 births
1896 deaths
American male comedians
American male stage actors
Burials at West Laurel Hill Cemetery
Male actors from Boston
Male actors from San Francisco
19th-century American male actors
Comedians from California